Namazonurus, is a genus of lizards, commonly known as Namaqua girdled lizards, in the family Cordylidae. The genus contains five species, which are endemic to southern Africa, and feed on insects and small vertebrates.

Species
The following species are recognized as being valid.
Namazonurus campbelli 
Namazonurus lawrenci 
Namazonurus namaquensis 
Namazonurus peersi 
Namazonurus pustulatus 

Nota bene: A binomial authority in parentheses indicates that the species was originally described in a genus other than Namazonurus.

References

Further reading
Stanley EL, Bauer AM, Jackman TR, Branch WR, Mouton PLFN (2011). "Between a rock and a hard polytomy: Rapid radiation in the rupicolous girdled lizards (Squamata: Cordylidae)". Molecular Phylogenetics and Evolution 58 (1): 53–70. (Namazonurus, new genus).

Namazonurus
Lizard genera